Andy Jackson (born 4 March 1979) is a Trinidadian cricketer. He played in fourteen first-class and seventeen List A matches for Trinidad and Tobago from 2000 to 2003.

See also
 List of Trinidadian representative cricketers

References

External links
 

1979 births
Living people
Trinidad and Tobago cricketers